The Rakasganda Fall is a tourist spot situated in Surajpur district, Chhattisgarh, India. Many transport buses are available, from Ambikapur and Wadraf Nagar, to reach Balangi, the last village before Rakasganda. From Balangi four-wheelers or two-wheelers can be hired to reach Rakasganda. The best time to see Rakasganda is around April – June.

References

See also 
 Surguja State
 Tourism in Chhattisgarh

Tourist attractions in Chhattisgarh